Ōpaheke railway station was a flag station serving Ōpaheke on the North Island Main Trunk in New Zealand. It was opened in 1875 and closed in 1955. It was called Hunua until 7 January 1912 and, though it didn't appear in the 1875 timetable, Hunua was described as a small wayside station on the line's opening day. When the line was extended to Hamilton, Hunua gained an extra train and the schedule was cut to 79 minutes.

Hunua opened on 20 May 1875, as part of the Auckland and Mercer Railway on 20 May 1875, built by Brogden & Co, when it was extended from Penrose. A limited service may have started earlier, as Brogden & Sons ran excursion trains to Drury in October 1874.

The station was opposite Ōpaheke Saleyards on Ōpaheke Road, on the Hay's Farm. It was a very small sixth class station, with a shelter shed ( by ). By 1884 there was a passenger platform with cart approach and a loading bank, and in 1894 there was a petition for a goods shed to be built. In 1891 the Coultland Brothers obtained permission to lay a tramway from the station. A suggestion was made in 1899 that a tramway could be laid between the station and Hunua coal seams. However, it seems that the Hunua Colliery only used road transport to get its coal to the railway at Papakura.

The station was damaged by fire on 3 May 1956 and the rest offered for sale in May 1963.

See also 
List of Auckland railway stations

References

External links
 Station on 1931 map
 1966 photo of repair after derailment caused by floods

Defunct railway stations in New Zealand